Xcelerator is a steel launched roller coaster at Knott's Berry Farm in Buena Park, California. It was Intamin's first hydraulically launched coaster, while also the fourth Intamin installation at Knott's, alongside Sky Cabin, Calico River Rapids and Perilous Plunge (removed in 2012).

History
Following the demise of the short-lived Windjammer Surf Racers, a dueling roller coaster plagued with issues surrounding its design and operation, Knott's Berry Farm announced its replacement in December 2001. The park hired Intamin to build and design a new roller coaster called Xcelerator, the company's first hydraulically-launched roller coaster, which uses pressurized oil and a series of hydraulic fluid chambers to rapidly propel a coaster train along a straight section of track. The total cost was $13 million. Intamin pioneered the hydraulic technology used on Xcelerator, which would later be built on a larger scale on future record-breaking rides, including Top Thrill Dragster at Cedar Point and Kingda Ka at Six Flags Great Adventure. The ride was originally scheduled to open in May 2002, but the opening was delayed to June 22, 2002.

In May 2004, California investigators asked that Knott's Berry Farm temporarily close Xcelerator, and that the nearby Six Flags Magic Mountain close Superman: Escape from Krypton, because the T-bar restraint systems used by both rides were potentially defective. This was due to three incidents where people died after falling out of the restraints, including Superman – Ride of Steel at Six Flags New England. The rides were closed on June 2, 2004, so the necessary modifications could be made; Xcelerator reopened at the end of the month. After an incident in 2009, the ride was closed while it underwent investigation; it reopened in April 2010.

Xcelerator was closed in July 2017 for maintenance. The ride eventually reopened in March 2018. It closed near the end of October 2021 for a new coat of paint; the ride now has the colors red, gray, orange, and yellow. Xcelerator closed again in mid-March 2022 due to a delayed shipment of a part, reopening date has not been confirmed.

Ride experience
It only uses  of track to launch the train. The twin hydraulic catapult motor achieves a maximum of  each while accelerating the train. In order for a train to launch, the train must "drift" back to "hook" on to a catch car. Twenty-four volts are used to demagnetize a pin underneath the third car, which causes it to drop. At the same time, two bellows actuators fill up with air. Meanwhile, near the back of the train, two drive tires that are holding the train in place begin to retract. Once connected the motor will engage to launch the train. The catch car passes over its own set of magnetic brakes to retard it. The motor has to work harder to attain launch speed if the train is not loaded with enough riders. On occasion, the catch car can overshoot its end position if it cannot attain the proper speed within set parameters, which causes it to stall near the end of the launch track. The train must also clear the launch track within three seconds. If it does not the ride will shut down. From the time the launch begins, the train has 8.25 seconds to pass over a proximity switch (Hall effect sensor) near the bottom of the first drop which clears the starting block. If the train does not pass over the switch within the given time frame, the ride will shut itself down.

The magnetic braking system consists of mounted magnetic clippers on the trains and copper alloy fins mounted onto the track. The alloy fins on the launch section retract during the launch procedure so as to not interfere with the train. In a case of a rollback, the magnetic brakes retard the train. They are raised section by section after the train has passed over them. The brake fins on the brake run are stationary and cannot be lowered. The train is traveling at approximately  when entering the brake run.

Trains

Xcelerator features two trains: red and violet. The trains themselves have spring-loaded wheel assemblies and are standard Intamin trains with specially crafted shells to make them look like 1957 Chevrolet Bel Air convertibles. Each train can fit 20 people; there are five cars per train, which each sit two people in two rows. This gives the ride a capacity of 1,330 riders per hour.

The red train was accidentally painted with its color scheme reversed when the ride opened. It featured a yellow color scheme with red flames in the front and side, instead of a red train with yellowish flames. During one of the ride's rehabs, the color scheme was corrected by repainting the red train with orange flames added to the front and sides. After an accident in 2009, the red train now features patriotic blue flames. Each train is five cars long and holds twenty passengers. A maximum of two trains can operate at any given time. However, the two train operation is only slightly more efficient than only using one train. Therefore, Xcelerator usually only operates with one train regardless of the number of people in the park. Instead, each train is used by itself for about a year, while the other is undergoing maintenance. When maintenance is completed on one of the trains, it is returned to active duty and the other train is sent to maintenance.

Restraints
Xcelerator's trains use hydraulically operated T-Bar lap bar restraints. These restraints are featured on Intamin's earlier accelerator coaster models. However, over-the-shoulder restraints are now used on the newer models due to safety concerns. Xcelerator also had special light meters installed on the restraints. The meter must show all green in order for a guest to ride. If the meter shows red then the guest cannot ride. Eventually the meter system was removed and the park now uses black lines etched on the side of each restraint. The black line must pass a certain part of the seat frame in order for the guest to ride. The ride also has seat belts that must be buckled before an operator pulls down the lap bar. Failure to do so slows the load time considerably. Another contributing factor involving the seat belts and a guest not being able to ride is requirement of one inch of slack must be pulled from the seat belt.

Limitations

Rollbacks

Occasionally, a train will not attain enough speed to make it over the initial  top hat element. Instead, the train will partially ascend the tower, stall and then roll back into magnetic brake fins situated on the launch track. This is known as a rollback and is part of the normal design of the ride. A rollback can cause the ride to close for an indefinite amount of time while the ride is reset and a sufficient number of test launches are performed. Rain, weight, frequency of launching, outside temperature, and overheating can contribute to a rollback.

Weather
The ride will not operate in the rain, even during drizzling conditions. This is to prevent rollbacks due to hydroplaning on the launch track.  The track usually needs to dry until maintenance has cleared it to operate again before the first test launch is made.  This is to reduce the chance of a rollback as well as preventing accidents.

Incidents

On September 16, 2009, a cable snapped during the launch of the ride, sending metal debris flying and seriously lacerating the leg of a 12-year-old boy. Another adult male rider complained of neck and back pain. A state investigation determined that the accident could have been avoided with more frequent inspections. The park only inspected the ride every six months, even though Intamin had recommended an inspection every month; Knott's Berry Farm was nearly three weeks behind on their regular six-month inspection. The state described the recommended maintenance inspection interval in the instructions, which Intamin provided Knott's Berry Farm, as confusing and unclear. Knott's Berry Farm and the boy's family agreed to an out-of-court settlement in 2011.

References

External links

 Official Xcelerator page
 Xcelerator Pictures on Ultimate Rollercoaster.com.

Roller coasters introduced in 2002
Roller coasters operated by Cedar Fair
Roller coasters in California
2002 establishments in California